Natalie Wolfsberg Madueño (born 7 November 1987) is a Danish actress best known to international audiences for her appearances in several "Nordic Noir" television drama series and in the 2019 Netflix series The Rain.

Early life and education
Madueño was born to a Spanish father and a Danish mother. She grew up in the Vesterbro district of Copenhagen and trained as an actor at the Danish National School of Performing Arts.

Career
Madueño had a leading role in the first two seasons of Follow the Money, which dealt with big business, crime, and corruption. In an interview, she described her character, Claudia, as a cutthroat person, saying, "I think the duality in her character attracted me to her". Her roles have turned her into one of Denmark's best-known younger actresses.

Madueño returned to Scandi-noir with the series Blinded: Those Who Kill, a spin-off series from Darkness: Those Who Kill.

Filmography

Film

Television

References

External links
 

1987 births
21st-century Danish actresses
People from Copenhagen
Danish people of Spanish descent
Living people